Solanum fallax is a species of plant in the family Solanaceae. It is found in Colombia and Ecuador.

References

fallax
Near threatened plants
Taxonomy articles created by Polbot